The 1980 Delaware Fightin' Blue Hens football team represented the University of Delaware as an independent during the 1980 NCAA Division I-AA football season. Led by 15th-year head coach, Tubby Raymond, the Fightin' Blue Hens finished the season with a record of 9–2, but failed to make the postseason. The team played its home games at Delaware Stadium in Newark, Delaware.

Schedule

Roster

References

Delaware
Delaware Fightin' Blue Hens football seasons
Delaware Fightin' Blue Hens football